Miles Maochun Yu (born 1962) is an American historian and strategist who served as the principal China policy and planning adviser to former United States Secretary of State Mike Pompeo. He is also a professor of military history and modern China at the United States Naval Academy in Annapolis, Maryland, a senior fellow at the Hudson Institute, where he directs the China Center,  and the Project 2049 Institute, and the Robert Alexander Mercer Visiting Fellow at the Hoover Institution. 

Yu wrote for "Inside China", the weekly column of The Washington Times, for several years. He has also hosted the "China Forum" lecture series. He is a member and contributor of the Military History and Contemporary Conflict Working Group and the China's Global Sharp Power Project at Hoover Institution.

Early life
Yu was born in China's Anhui province and grew up in Chongqing. In 1979, he enrolled in Nankai University, where he studied history. He was inspired by President Ronald Reagan, whose speeches Yu heard on Voice of America broadcasts, to move to the United States. In 1985, he moved to Pennsylvania to study at Swarthmore College.

Yu earned his PhD from the University of California, Berkeley in 1994, where he was a proponent for the 1989 Tiananmen Square protests. After graduation, he joined the faculty of the United States Naval Academy as a professor of modern China and military history.

United States Department of State  
Yu joined the Trump administration as its principal China policy planner and strategist, working under then-Secretary of State Mike Pompeo. Yu is regarded as one of the few senior U.S. government officials who have spent a significant period of time living inside communist China, is fluent in the Chinese language, and is familiar with the Chinese Communist Party's political culture and ideological nomenclature. He and Pompeo are seen as responsible for the Trump administration's "broad pushback against China." Under Pompeo, Yu worked with Kelley Eckels Currie, Mung Chiang, and David Stilwell to shape America's foreign policy toward China. He was often deemed a key influence on United States-Chinese policy within the administration. He has called his work under the Trump Administration on China "principled realism", which includes a distinction between the Chinese people and the CCP that rules the country.

Columnist Alex Lo of the South China Morning Post has called Yu's previous analyses as "hawk-ish".

Sanctioning by Chinese government 
On December 23, 2022, the Chinese Foreign Ministry announced that Yu, along with Todd Stein of the Congressional-Executive Commission on China, would be subject to sanctions taking effect the same day, including a freezing of all Chinese assets of the two, and an entry ban including their family members. The order specified that the measures were in retaliation to the sanctioning of former top Tibet official Wu Yingjie and Tibet police chief Zhang Hongbo by the United States earlier that month over alleged human rights violations, but made no specific accusations against Yu. Yu responded by calling the sanctions on him "a badge of honor" and a publicity stunt by the Chinese government.

Bibliography 
Yu has published widely on China, U.S.-China relations, World War II/Asia, military history and the history of intelligence. His main works include OSS in China: Prelude to Cold War (Yale University Press, 1997), The Dragon's War: Allied Operations and the Fate of China, 1937-1947. (Naval Institute Press, 2006).

References

External links 

 US Naval Academy professor page

Nankai University alumni
Swarthmore College alumni
United States Naval Academy faculty
University of California, Berkeley alumni
Politicians from Chongqing
Chinese emigrants to the United States
United States Department of State officials
American newspaper writers
Trump administration personnel
Chinese dissidents
American politicians of Chinese descent
Chinese anti-communists
1962 births
Living people
American anti-communists
Hudson Institute